Marada were a group of autonomous communities living on Mount Lebanon during the Middle Ages.

Marada may also refer to:

 Marada (comics), a fantasy comic book character created in 1982 by John Bolton and Chris Claremont
 Marada (mammal), a genus of prehistoric mammals
 The Marada Brigade, a Maronite militia in the Lebanese Civil War
 Marada Movement, a Lebanese political party
 Marada, Libya, a town in Libya
 Marda, Salfit; alt. name for this Palestinian town